St. Thomas Institute for Science and Technology is an engineering educational institution located in Kattaikonam, Trivandrum, Kerala, India offering engineering education and research. This college was established by the Mar Thoma Church Educational Society (MTCES) in 2010. The college is affiliated to the University of Kerala and the Kerala Technological University.

Academics
The following courses of are approved by the All India Council for Technical Education (AICTE) and sanctioned by the Government of Kerala, leading to the B.Tech. Degree of the University of Kerala and Kerala Technological University. It has an annual intake of 240 students for B.Tech courses. The distribution of seats are as follows.

 Civil Engineering : 60 seats
 Computer Science & Engineering : 60 seats
 Electrical & Electronics Engineering : 30 seats
 Electronics & Communications Engineering : 30 seats
 Mechanical Engineering : 60 seats

St. Thomas offers M.Tech programmes in the Civil Engineering Department.

References

Engineering colleges in Thiruvananthapuram
Educational institutions established in 2010